The Denver Formation is a geological formation that is present within the central part of the Denver Basin that underlies the Denver, Colorado, area. It ranges in age from latest Cretaceous (Maastrichtian) to early Paleocene, and includes sediments that were deposited before, during and after the Cretaceous-Paleogene boundary event.

The formation is known for its paleontological resources, including dinosaur remains that are found in the Late Cretaceous part of the formation, and it includes aquifers that are important sources of water for the area.

Stratigraphy 
The Denver Formation rests on the Arapahoe Formation, and its base is marked by the first appearance of tuffaceous sediments. It is overlain by the Dawson Arkose.

In 2002 the Denver Formation was included as part of a larger unconformity-bounded unit named the D1 sequence, in order to facilitate basin-wide studies and avoid confusion arising from the lateral and vertical facies changes that occur within the Denver Basin. The base of the D1 is marked by the abrupt facies change at the top of the Laramie Formation, and its top is placed at the base of a regional paleosol series. The Arapahoe Formation and the Dawson Arkose are also included in the D1 Sequence.

Thickness and lithology 
The Denver Formation consists of alluvial fan, fluvial, and paludal deposits that accumulated at the foot of the growing Rocky Mountain Front Ranges. It is characterized by significant amounts of andesitic volcanic debris, and is composed of primarily of light-grey to brown, lenticular bedded, loosely cemented silty claystone, mudstone, siltstone, tuffaceous sandstone and, in some areas, andesitic conglomerate. Beds of low-rank coal and carbonaceous shale occur in the upper  in some areas.

Several early Paleocene lava flows are present in the upper part of the Denver Formation at North and South Table Mountain near Golden, Colorado. The Ralston Dike, a body of intrusive monzonite located several miles to the northwest, probably represents the volcanic vent from which the flows erupted. Generally referred to as basaltic, they are classified either as monzonite (the lowest flow) and latite (the upper two flows), or as shoshonite.  They contain the minerals augite, plagioclase, and olivine altered to serpentine, with accessory sanidine and/or orthoclase, apatite, magnetite, and biotite. One of the flows hosts a wide variety of zeolite minerals, including analcime, thomsonite, mesolite, chabazite, and others.

Age and paleontology 
The Denver Formation spans the Cretaceous-Paleogene boundary. The lava flows in the upper part of the formation are about 62 to 64 million years old according to radiometric dating, which places them in the early Paleocene Epoch. The Cretaceous-Paleogene boundary occurs in the lower part of the formation, and an exposure of the boundary layer has been identified and documented on South Table Mountain near the city of Golden.

Plant fossils and remains of vertebrates, including turtles and mammals, are found throughout the Denver Formation. Dinosaur remains are restricted to the lower, Late Cretaceous, part.

Cretaceous vertebrate paleofauna

Ornithischian dinosaurs

Saurischian dinosaurs

See also 

 List of dinosaur-bearing rock formations
 Fort Union Formation

References

Bibliography 
 Weishampel, David B.; Dodson, Peter; and Osmólska, Halszka (eds.): The Dinosauria, 2nd, Berkeley: University of California Press. 861 pp.

External links

Geologic formations of Colorado
Geology of the Rocky Mountains
Paleogene stratigraphic units of North America
Maastrichtian Stage of North America
Danian Stage
Cretaceous–Paleogene boundary
Sandstone formations of the United States
Shale formations of the United States
Siltstone formations
Coal formations
Tuff formations
Fossiliferous stratigraphic units of North America
Paleontology in Colorado
Fluvial deposits
Paludal deposits